Sir George Howard Darwin,  (9 July 1845 – 7 December 1912) was an English barrister and astronomer, the second son and fifth child of Charles Darwin and Emma Darwin.

Biography

George H. Darwin was born at Down House, Kent, the fifth child of biologist Charles Darwin and Emma Darwin.

From the age of 11 he studied under Charles Pritchard at Clapham Grammar School, and entered St John's College, Cambridge, in 1863, though he soon moved to Trinity College, where his tutor was Edward John Routh. He graduated as second wrangler in 1868, when he was also placed second for the Smith's Prize and was appointed to a college fellowship. He earned his M.A. in 1871. He was admitted to the bar in 1872, but returned to science. 
George Darwin conducted studies into the prevalence and health outcomes of contemporary first-cousin marriages in Great Britain. His father Charles had become concerned after the death of three of his children, including his favorite daughter, Annie, from tuberculosis in 1851, that his and Emma's union may have been a mistake from a biological perspective. He was reassured by George's results.

Darwinian mechanics

Although George Darwin was the son of the famous biologist, Charles Darwin, rather than moving predominantly into the field of biology like his father, George instead kept his focus on geology. Subsequently, his efforts within geology caused him to stumble onto many seemingly radical ideas, some of which were related to the notion that preserved within the physical structure of the planet was the mechanical energy (or the collective inertial motion), which may have allowed an ancient rapidly spinning Earth to somehow expel a piece of its mass, and it was this expelled mass which later congealed to create the natural satellite that was now in orbit around the Earth. So, before the Apollo mission and the rise to prominence of the relativistic notion that the origin of the Moon was due in part to collisions within a very active protoplanetary disk, there was a radically different depiction of lunar and planetary evolution, which was proposed by George Darwin, in 1879, called the Fission Theory.

In 1879, he was elected a Fellow of the Royal Society and won their Royal Medal in 1884 and their Copley Medal in 1911. He delivered their Bakerian Lecture in 1891 on the subject of "tidal prediction".

In 1883 Darwin became Plumian Professor of Astronomy and Experimental Philosophy at the University of Cambridge. He studied tidal forces involving the Sun, Moon, and Earth, and formulated the fission theory of Moon formation.

Darwin was a Fellow of the Royal Astronomical Society (RAS) and won the Gold Medal of the RAS in 1892. From 1899–1901 he served as President of the RAS. The RAS founded a prize lectureship in 1984 and named it the George Darwin Lectureship in Darwin's honour.

He was an invited speaker in the International Congress of Mathematicians 1908, Rome on the topic of "Mechanics, Physical Mathematics, Astronomy." As President of the Cambridge Philosophical Society, he also gave the Introductory Address to the Congress in 1912 on the character of pure and applied mathematics.

He received the degree of Doctor mathematicae (honoris causa) from the Royal Frederick University on 6 September 1902, when they celebrated the centennial of the birth of mathematician Niels Henrik Abel. Darwin crater on Mars is named after him.

Family

Darwin married Martha (Maud) du Puy, the daughter of Charles du Puy of Philadelphia, in 1884; his wife was a member of the Ladies Dining Society in Cambridge, with 11 other members.

She died on 6 February 1947. They had three sons and two daughters:

 Gwen Raverat (1885–1957), artist.
 Sir Charles Galton Darwin (1887–1962), physicist and applied mathematician.
 Margaret Elizabeth Darwin (1890–1974), married Sir Geoffrey Keynes.
 William Robert Darwin (1894–1970)
 Leonard Darwin (1899–1899)

George and Maud Darwin bought Newnham Grange, Cambridge in 1885. The Darwins extensively remodelled the house.  Since 1962 the Grange has been part of Darwin College, Cambridge.

He is buried in Trumpington Extension Cemetery in Cambridge with his son Leonard and his daughter Gwen (Raverat), his wife Lady Maud Darwin was cremated at Cambridge Crematorium; his brothers Sir Francis Darwin and Sir Horace Darwin and their respective wives are interred in the Parish of the Ascension Burial Ground.

Works 

 The tides and kindred phenomena in the solar system (Boston, Houghton, 1899)
 Problems connected with the tides of a viscous spheroid (London, Harrison and Sons, 1879–1882) 
 Scientific papers (Volume 1): Oceanic tides and lunar disturbances of gravity (Cambridge : University Press, 1907)
 Scientific papers (Volume 2): Tidal friction and cosmogony. (Cambridge : University Press, 1908)
 Scientific papers (Volume 3): Figures of equilibrium of rotating liquid and geophysical investigations. (Cambridge : University Press, 1908) 
 Scientific papers (Volume 4): Periodic orbits and miscellaneous papers. (Cambridge : University Press, 1911)
 Scientific papers (Volume 5) Supplementary volume, containing biographical memoirs by Sir Francis Darwin and Professor E. W. Brown, lectures on Hill's lunar theory, etc... (Cambridge : University Press, 1916)
 The Scientific Papers of Sir George Darwin. 1907. Cambridge University Press (rep. by Cambridge University Press, 2009)

Articles
 "On Beneficial Restrictions to Liberty of Marriage," The Contemporary Review, Vol. XXII, June/November 1873.
 "Commodities Versus Labour," The Contemporary Review, Vol. XXII, June/November 1873.
 "The Birth of a Satellite" Harper's Monthly Magazine, December 1903, pages 124 to 130.

References

External links

 

"The Genesis of Double Stars"  – by George Darwin, from A.C. Seward's Darwin and Modern Science  (1909).

details of correspondence
Trinity College Chapel memorial

1845 births
1912 deaths
19th-century British astronomers
19th-century English mathematicians
Darwin–Wedgwood family
Knights Commander of the Order of the Bath
Fellows of the Royal Society
Foreign associates of the National Academy of Sciences
Recipients of the Copley Medal
Alumni of St John's College, Cambridge
Alumni of Trinity College, Cambridge
Fellows of Trinity College, Cambridge
Royal Medal winners
Second Wranglers
Recipients of the Gold Medal of the Royal Astronomical Society
Presidents of the British Science Association
Corresponding members of the Saint Petersburg Academy of Sciences
Presidents of the Royal Astronomical Society
English eugenicists
Victoria Medal recipients
20th-century British astronomers
Plumian Professors of Astronomy and Experimental Philosophy